Livadi is a village in Pieria regional unit, Greece. Since the 2011 local government reform it is part of the municipality Pydna-Kolindros, of which it is a municipal community. The 2011 census recorded 235 residents in the village. The community of Livadi covers an area of 14.769 km2.

See also
 Pydna-Kolindros

References

Populated places in Pieria (regional unit)